Tarana is a type of composition in Indian classical vocal music.

Tarana may also refer to:

Places
Tarana, New South Wales, a small town in New South Wales
Tarana railway station, station on the Main Western line in New South Wales, Australia
Tarana (Madhya Pradesh), a town in Ujjain district of Madhya Pradesh State in India
Tarana Road railway station, small railway station in Ujjain district, Madhya Pradesh
Tarana, a town in Lower Egypt, site of the ancient city of Terenuthis

People

Given name 
Tarana Abbasova (born 1967), Azerbaijani female weightlifter
Tarana Burke, American activist, pioneer of the Me Too movement
Tarana Halim (born 1966), Bangladeshi politician, former lawyer, television and film actress and playwright
Tarana Raja, Indian actress, dancer and TV anchor

Surname 
Emiliano Tarana (born 1979), Italian football player 
Seema Tarana or Sima Tarana, Afghan singer

Others
Tarana (1951 film), a 1951 Indian film starring Madhubala
Taraana, a 1979 Hindi film starring Mithun Chakravorty
Radio Tarana, New Zealand radio network, broadcasting in Auckland, Hamilton and Wellington
"Tarana-e-Milli", or Anthem of the Community, poem in which Allama Mohammad Iqbal paid tribute to the Muslim Ummah (nation) and Muhammad, the prophet of the Muslims
"Qaumī Tarāna", national anthem of Pakistan
"Tarana-e-Pakistan, claimed to be the first national anthem that was played in Pakistan's national radio on 14 August 1947

See also 
Taran (disambiguation)
Taranis (disambiguation)
Tarhana, Southeast European and Middle Eastern dried food made up of grain, yoghurt or fermented milk